Youyi (友谊; lit. "friendship") may refer to the following locations:

Youyi Bridge, a bridge between Xinjiang and Pakistan
Youyi County, Shuangyashan, Heilongjiang
Friendship Pass, or Youyi Guan, a pass between Guangxi and Vietnam 
Youyi Road Station (Shanghai), a metro station in Shanghai Municipality

Subdistricts
Youyi Subdistrict, Zhanjiang, in Xiashan District, Zhanjiang, Guangdong
Youyi Subdistrict, Shijiazhuang, in Qiaoxi District, Shijiazhuang, Hebei
Youyi Subdistrict, Daqing, in Sartu District, Daqing, Heilongjiang
Youyi Subdistrict, Jiamusi, in Jiaoqu, Jiamusi, Heilongjiang
Youyi Subdistrict, Jungar Banner, Inner Mongolia
Youyi Subdistrict, Dalian, in Jinzhou District, Dalian, Liaoning
Youyi Subdistrict, Panjin, in Xinglongtai District, Panjin, Liaoning
Youyi Road Subdistrict, Shanghai, in Baoshan District
Youyi Road Subdistrict, Tianjin, in Hexi District

Towns
Youyi, Guangxi, location of the Friendship Pass, in Pingxiang
Youyi, Youyi County, Heilongjiang

Townships
Youyi Township, Xinlong County, Sichuan
Youyi Daur, Manchu, and Kirghiz Ethnic Township (友谊达斡尔族满族柯尔克孜族乡), Fuyu County, Heilongjiang
Youyi may also refer to other pages with similar romanisation under the Pinyin scheme:
Artistes
Youyi (actress), (有懿) a Singaporean actress.